Sergio Casal and Emilio Sánchez  were the defending champions, but lost to Omar Camporese and Goran Ivanisevic in the quarterfinals. Camporese and Ivanisevic went on to win the title, defeating Luke Jensen and Laurie Warder in the finals, 6–2, 6–3.

Seeds

Draw

Finals

Top half

Bottom half

References

External links
 1991 Peugeot Italian Open Doubles Draw

1991 Italian Open (tennis)